Sigue... "La Leyenda"!!! is the sixteenth album released by the New Mexico music performer Al Hurricane in 1995. The songs "El Rebelde" and "Baila Bailame" were featured on his  Live At The Kimo albums, with his son Al Hurricane, Jr; and in the A Tribute to Al Hurricane concert, the song "Baila Bailame" was covered by Sorela.

Track listing

References

Al Hurricane albums
New Mexico music albums
1990 albums